Edwin van Ankeren (born 13 August 1968) is a Dutch former professional footballer who played as a striker.

Playing career

Club
A journeyman striker, Van Ankeren has played professionally in his native Holland as well as in Italy, France and Norway. He was, however, most successful during his spells with different clubs in Belgium. He only had one season with Dutch club PSV, whom he left for Eendracht Aalst  in 1994.

He left Italian side Viterbese in March 2001 after only seven weeks, claiming the club did not pay his wages. After spells in Norway, van Ankeren returned to Holland in 2005 to join newly formed professional club FC Omniworld.

Managerial career
During his spell at Norwegian lower league side Tollnes BK, Van Ankeren already acted as player/assistant coach. In summer 2007, Van Ankeren started his career as full-time coach with Lelystad amateur side Unicum and shared his duties with Michel van Oostrum.

Van Ankeren was named caretaker manager of Almere City after the club disposed of Dick de Boer in September 2012.

Honours
Germinal Ekeren
 Belgian Cup: 1996–97

References

External links
 Voetbal international
 Profile at Dutch players abroad
 French league stats - LFP
 Biography

1968 births
Living people
Footballers from Amsterdam
Association football forwards
Dutch footballers
PEC Zwolle players
K.S.K. Beveren players
R.W.D. Molenbeek players
PSV Eindhoven players
S.C. Eendracht Aalst players
Beerschot A.C. players
En Avant Guingamp players
U.S. Viterbese 1908 players
Odds BK players
Tollnes BK players
Almere City FC players
Eerste Divisie players
Belgian Pro League players
Challenger Pro League players
Eredivisie players
Ligue 1 players
Ligue 2 players
Eliteserien players
Dutch expatriate footballers
Expatriate footballers in Belgium
Expatriate footballers in France
Expatriate footballers in Italy
Expatriate footballers in Norway
Dutch expatriate sportspeople in Belgium
Dutch expatriate sportspeople in France
Dutch expatriate sportspeople in Italy
Dutch expatriate sportspeople in Norway
Dutch football managers
Almere City FC managers